The Battle of Dvin in 1045 was a failed attempt by the Byzantines under Constantine IX Monomachos to capture Dvin, then ruled by Kurds. The Byzantines assembled a large force under the command of Michael Iasites and Constantine the Alan and allied with Armenians under the command of Vahram Pahlawuni and Liparit Orbelean. To defend the city, Abu'l-Aswar flooded the surrounding fields, limiting the attacking army's mobility and causing it to fall victim to defenders' arrows. The attackers were completely broken Kurds, and Vahram killed.

References 
 
 

11th-century conflicts
Battles involving the Byzantine Empire
1045 in Asia
1040s in the Byzantine Empire
Shaddadids
11th century in Armenia
History of Dvin